Dream Chasers, Dream-chaser, dreamchasers or variant may refer to:

Meek Mill related
 Dream Chasers Records, record label founded by Meek Mill in 2012
 Dreamchasers series of mixtapes by Meek Mill
Dreamchasers 1, 2011 mixtape by Meek Mill
 Dreamchasers 2, 2012 mixtape by Meek Mill
 Dreamchasers 3, 2013 mixtape by Meek Mill
DC4, 2016 mixtape by Meek Mill

Other
 Dreamchaser, 2013 album by Sarah Brightman
 Dream Chaser, Sierra-Nevada Corporation spaceplane
 Dream-Chaser, a book by Sherrilyn Kenyon about the Dream-Hunters

See also
 Dream (disambiguation)
 Chaser (disambiguation)